Marjorie Kennedy may refer to:

 Marjory Kennedy-Fraser (1857–1930), Scottish singer, composer and music teacher
 Marjorie Kennedy (librarian) (1915–2002), Scottish librarian